Émile Lefebvre was a French playwright and chansonnier of the 19th century whose plays were performed at the Théâtre des Délassements-Comiques, and at the Théâtre des Variétés.

Œuvres 
181: 400,000 francs pour vingt sous, vaudeville in 1 act, with Émile Colliot
1851: Dans l'autre monde, rêverie vaudeville in 2 acts and 3 tableaux, with Colliot
1852: L'Ami de la maison, comédie en vaudevilles in 1 act, with Colliot
1854: La Revue de Reims 1853, ou Remi, la Nesle et Cie, folie-vaudeville in 6 tableaux, with Léon Delmas
1860: A Notre-Dame d'Espérance, music by Eugène Willent Bordogni
1861: A Notre-Dame de la Sallette, music by Bordogni
1861: Au nom du Christ, music by Bordogni
1861: Vole magondole, barcarolle, music by Bordogni
1864: Elle a passé !!!, romance, music by Bordogni
undated: Les Cris de Reims. Quets ! Quets ! des beaux bouquets !, music by Gustave Bley

19th-century French dramatists and playwrights
French chansonniers
Year of birth missing
Year of death missing